IFEX may refer to:

Ifosfamide, drug marketed as Mitoxana or Ifex
Impulse Fire Extinguishing System
International Freedom of Expression Exchange